Králíky or Králiky may refer to places:

Czech Republic
Králíky, a town in the Pardubice Region
Králíky (Hradec Králové District), a municipality and village in the Hradec Králové Region
Slovakia
Králiky, a municipality and village in the Banská Bystrica Region

See also
Králík